The Archdeacon of Macclesfield is a senior ecclesiastical officer within the Diocese of Chester. As such she or he is responsible for the disciplinary supervision of the clergy within its six rural deaneries: Bowdon, Congleton, Knutsford, Macclesfield, Mottram, Nantwich, Chadkirk, Cheadle and Stockport.

The archdeaconry of Macclesfield was created from the Chester archdeaconry on 21 September 1880 (the Diocese of Liverpool having been created from the Liverpool archdeaconry earlier that year). The current incumbent is Ian Bishop.

List of archdeacons
1880–1884 (res.): James Kelly
1884–1893 (res.): Arthur Gore
1893–1904 (res.): Maxwell Woosnam
1904–28 December 1918 (d.): Maitland Wood
1919–27 April 1922 (d.): Edward Mercer
1922–7 January 1932 (d.): John Thorpe
1932–26 October 1941 (d.): John Armitstead
1941–7 October 1950 (d.): Frank Okell (also Bishop suffragan of Stockport from 1949)
1950–1958 (ret.): Tyler Whittle (afterwards archdeacon emeritus)
1958–4 April 1965 (d.): Thomas Clarke
1965–13 May 1967 (d.): Harry Saunders
1967–1978 (ret.): Francis House (afterwards archdeacon emeritus)
1978–1985 (ret.): Rennie Simpson (afterwards archdeacon emeritus)
1985–1994 (res.): John Gaisford
1994–2010 (ret.): Richard Gillings (afterwards archdeacon emeritus)
2011–present: Ian Bishop

References

 
Anglican ecclesiastical offices
Lists of Anglicans
Lists of English people
Diocese of Chester